Abner Pond is a  pond in Plymouth, Massachusetts. The pond is located east of the boundary of Myles Standish State Forest within Camp Cachalot, southeast of Fearing Pond, northeast of Charge Pond, north of Little Long Pond, northwest of Five Mile Pond, and west of Fawn Pond.

External links
Environmental Protection Agency

Ponds of Plymouth, Massachusetts
Ponds of Massachusetts